Edward "Ted" Andrew Miguel (born 1974) is the Oxfam Professor of Environmental and Resource Economics in the Department of Economics at University of California, Berkeley, US. He is the founder and faculty director of the Center for Effective Global Action (CEGA) at U.C. Berkeley.

His research focuses on African economic development and includes work on the economic causes and consequences of violence; the impact of ethnic divisions on local collective action; and interactions between health, education, environment, and productivity for the poor. He has conducted fieldwork in Kenya, Sierra Leone, Tanzania, and India. More recently, Miguel has focused his efforts on increasing transparency in social science research. Along with colleagues, such as Michael Kremer, Esther Duflo, Dean Karlan and Abhijit Banerjee, he has pioneered the use of randomized controlled trials and other rigorous evaluation methods to test the impact of development interventions in the field. In 2019, Michael Kremer, Esther Duflo, and Abhijit Banerjee were awarded the 2019 Nobel Prize in Economics for "their experimental approach to alleviating global poverty." The Nobel Prize's Scientific Background on this award cited Miguel's joint research with Michael Kremer on school-based deworming in Kenya, among several of his other studies.

Education 
Miguel attended Tenafly High School in Tenafly, New Jersey, from which he graduated as the valedictorian of the class of 1992.

He earned S.B. degrees in economics and mathematics from the Massachusetts Institute of Technology in 1996, where he was a Truman Scholar. In 2000 he completed a PhD in economics at Harvard University with a thesis entitled Political Economy of Education and Health in Kenya under the supervision of Michael Kremer, Abhijit Banerjee, Alberto Alesina, and Lawrence F. Katz where he was a National Science Foundation Graduate Fellow.

Career 
Miguel has been a professor of economics at the University of California, Berkeley since 2000. He is also a faculty research associate of the National Bureau of Economic Research, and has been an associate editor of the Quarterly Journal of Economics and Journal of Development Economics, and a member of the Board of Reviewing Editors for Science. His research has been funded by the U.S. National Institutes of Health, National Science Foundation, USAID, Bill and Melinda Gates Foundation, and the World Bank, among others.

In 2008, Miguel founded the Center for Effective Global Action (CEGA), a hub for research on global development. Headquartered at UC Berkeley, CEGA's large, interdisciplinary network of over 150 West-Coast based faculty affiliates—and a growing number of scholars from low- and middle-income countries—identifies and tests innovations designed to reduce poverty and promote development. CEGA's researchers use rigorous field trials, behavioral experiments, and tools from data science to measure and maximize the impacts of development programs throughout the world, generating actionable evidence for decision-makers. In 2011, CEGA launched the East Africa Social Science Translation (EASST) Collaborative, a research network aimed at promoting scientific evaluation of social and economic development programs in East Africa. EASST has invited and trained over 30 researchers from Kenya, Uganda, Rwanda, Tanzania, and Ethiopia through semester-long fellowships at UC Berkeley, focused on diverse research topics related to health, education, governance, and agriculture.

In 2002, Miguel co-founded the Working Group in African Political Economy (WGAPE), a network of US and Africa-based researchers that meet bi-annually to provide structured feedback on in-progress research papers related to the theme of African political economy.

In 2004, Edward Miguel and Michael Kremer published the results of an impact evaluation on school-based deworming in Kenya.  They determined that deworming is a cost-effective way to increase school attendance rates and improve community health. Their findings helped lead to the establishment of Deworm the World, a non-profit that works directly with governments and other organizations to expand school-based deworming worldwide in the following capacities: policy and advocacy with governments; prevalence surveying and mapping; program planning and management; public awareness and mobilization; monitoring and evaluation; training and distribution cascade; drug management and coordination. Deworm the World and the government initiatives it supports have treated over 280 million children in Ethiopia, India, Kenya, Nigeria, Pakistan, and Vietnam. Subsequent work has shown long-term positive impacts of deworming on labor market outcomes, including new research that shows children who received an additional 2 to 3 years of deworming earn higher wages, have higher household consumption and are more likely to live in urban areas. Their research was covered by several news outlets including The New York Times, The Boston Globe, the Chicago Tribune, NPR, and Vox. This included a piece by Nicholas Kristof of The New York Times on the importance of impact evaluations in determining policy.

Miguel and co-authors Shankar Satyanath and Ernest Sergenti published a seminal 2004 research article that used annual variation in rainfall to estimate the impact of economic conditions on the civil war in sub-Saharan Africa.  The study shows that a 5 percent negative growth shock increases the likelihood of civil conflict the following year by more than one half, suggesting that economic conditions are a critical determinant of civil war.

Miguel and Raymond Fisman published a study in 2006, which compared the number of parking violations per UN diplomat in New York to Transparency International's Corruption Perceptions Index. The results found a strong correlation between political corruption and parking tickets, highlighting the role of cultural norms and legal enforcement in corruption. The results were covered in The Economist, Forbes, The New York Times, NPR, The Guardian, CNN, and more. In 2008 Miguel and Fisman co-authored the book, Economic Gangsters: Corruption, Violence and the Poverty of Nations. It has been translated into eleven languages including Chinese, Persian, and German and Kristof praised it as "smart and eminently readable".

Miguel, Solomon Hsiang, and Marshall Burke published a study in 2013 that found strong causal evidence linking climatic events to human conflict across all major regions of the world. This paper garnered national and international media attention from sources including Time magazine, The Economist, and The Washington Post. Miguel also presented the results of the study in a Ted talk in 2014. In 2015, Miguel, Hsiang, and Burke published a study quantifying the effect of temperature on economic production across countries. The study was cited in a 2017 article in Science on combating climate change written by U.S. President Barack Obama. Both studies have been influential in climate policy and were cited in a special report on the impacts of global warming by the United Nations Intergovernmental Panel on Climate Change (IPCC).

In 2012 Miguel helped launch the Berkeley Initiative for Transparency in the Social Sciences (BITSS), which aims to promote transparency in empirical social science research. BITSS engages researchers through participatory forums on critical issues surrounding data transparency and encourages the use of study registries, pre-analysis plans, data sharing, and replication. In 2012, Miguel and co-authors published one of the first Economics research papers based on a pre-analysis plan. In 2014, Miguel and co-authors published a piece in Science that makes the case for better research transparency practices in the social sciences. In 2015, Miguel and co-authors published another price in Science on the Transparency and Openness Promotion (TOP) guidelines. In 2019, Miguel, Garret Christensen, and Jeremy Freese published Transparent and Reproducible Social Science Research, a textbook on tools for increasing the rigor and credibility of social science research. Miguel gave a talk on the book at the 2019 National Bureau of Economic Research Summer Institute Methods Lecture.

In 2016, Miguel co-founded the Berkeley Opportunity Lab, which generates rigorous evidence on critical issues surrounding poverty and inequality in the United States and other countries.

In 2019, Miguel, Dennis Egger, Johannes Haushofer, Paul Niehaus, and Michael Walker released a high-profile study on the effects of an unconditional cash transfer program by the nonprofit organization GiveDirectly in rural Kenya. The study found positive effects for cash transfer recipients, in addition to large positive spillover effects for non-recipients. Co-authors estimate a local transfer payments multiplier greater than 2. These results were covered in The Washington Post, The Economist, NPR, and Vox.

Awards 
 2020 Elected Member of the American Academy of Arts and Sciences
 2015 Carol D. Soc Distinguished Graduate Student Mentoring Award
 2014 Chancellor's Award for Public Service for Research in the Public Interest
 2012 UC Berkeley Distinguished Teaching Award
 2010 Kiel Institute Excellence Award in Global Economic Affairs
 2005 Kenneth J. Arrow Award for the best paper in health economics (entitled "Worms: Identifying impacts on education and health in the presence of treatment externalities"), presented by the International Health Economics Association
 2005 Alfred P. Sloan Fellowship
 2003–04 UC Berkeley Distinguished Teaching Award, Social Sciences Division
 1995 Truman Scholarship (NJ)

Selected publications 

 Hamory, Joan, Edward Miguel, Michael Walker, Michael Kremer, and Sarah Baird. (2020). "Twenty Year Economic Impacts of Deworming", NBER Working Paper No. 27611. 
 Lee, Kenneth, Edward Miguel, and Catherine Wolfram. (2020). "Experimental Evidence on the Economics of Rural Electrification", Journal of Political Economy, 128 (4): 1523–1565. 
 Christensen, Garret, Jeremy Freese, and Edward Miguel. (2019). Transparent and Reproducible Social Science Research: How to Do Open Science. Berkeley, CA: University of California Press. 
 Egger, Dennis, Johannes Haushofer, Edward Miguel, Paul Niehaus, and Michael Walker. (2019). "General Equilibrium Effects of Cash Transfers: Experimental Evidence from Kenya", NBER Working Paper No. 26600. 
 Baird, Sarah, Joan Hamory Hicks, Michael Kremer and Edward Miguel. (2016). "Worms at Work: Long-run impacts of a child health investment", Quarterly Journal of Economics, 131(4): 1637–1680. 
 Burke, Marshall, Solomon Hsiang, and Edward Miguel. 2015. "Global non-linear effect of temperature on economic production", Nature. 
 B. A. Nosek, G. Alter, G. C. Banks, D. Borsboom, S. D. Bowman, S. J. Breckler, S. Buck, C. D. Chambers, G. Chin, G. Christensen, M. Contestabile, A. Dafoe, E. Eich, J. Freese, R. Glennerster, D. Goroff, D. P. Green, B. Hesse, M. Humphreys, J. Ishiyama, D. Karlan, A. Kraut, A. Lupia, P. Mabry, T. A. Madon, N. Malhotra, E. Mayo-Wilson, M. McNutt, E. Miguel, E. Levy Paluck, U. Simonsohn, C. Soderberg, B. A. Spellman, J. Turitto, G. VandenBos, S. Vazire, E. J. Wagenmakers, R. Wilson, and T. Yarkoni. "Promoting an Open Research Culture: Author guidelines for journals could help to promote transparency, openness, and reproducibility", Science, 2015, 26 June 2015 348(6242): 1422–1425. 
 E. Miguel, C. Camerer, K. Casey, J. Cohen, K. M. Esterling, A. Gerber, R. Glennerster, D. P. Green, M. Humphreys, G. Imbens, D. Laitin, T. Madon, L. Nelson, B. A. Nosek, M. Petersen, R. Sedlmayr, J. P. Simmons, U. Simonsohn, M. Van der Laan. 2014. "Promoting Transparency in Social Science Research". Science.  
 Hsiang, Solomon M., Marshall Burke, and Edward, Miguel. 2013. "Quantifying the Influence of Climate Change on Human Conflict". Science.  
 Casey, Katherine, Rachel Glennerster, and Edward Miguel. 2012. "Reshaping Institutions: Evidence on Aid Impacts Using a Pre analysis Plan". Quarterly Journal of Economics 127 (4): 1755–1812. 
 Kremer, Michael, Jessica Leino, Edward Miguel, and Alix Peterson. 2011. "Spring Cleaning: Rural Water Impacts, Valuation, and Property Rights Institutions". Quarterly Journal of Economics 126 (1): 145–205. 
 Blattman, Christopher, and Edward Miguel. 2010. "Civil War". Journal of Economic Literature 48 (1): 3-57. 
 Kremer, Michael, Edward Miguel, and Rebecca Thornton. (2009). "Incentives to Learn". The Review of Economics and Statistics. 91 (3): 437–456.
 Miguel, Edward. Africa's Turn?. Boston Review Books, 2009.
 Miguel, Edward and Raymond Fisman. Economic Gangsters: Corruption, Violence, and the Poverty of Nations, Princeton University Press, 2008.
 Kremer, Michael, and Edward Miguel. 2007. "The Illusion of Sustainability". Quarterly Journal of Economics 112 (3): 1007–1065. 
 Fisman, Raymond, and Edward Miguel. 2007. "Corruption, Norms and Legal Enforcement: Evidence from Diplomatic Parking Tickets". Journal of Political Economy 115 (6): 1020–1048. 
 Miguel, Edward. 2005. "Poverty and Witch Killing". The Review of Economic Studies. 72 (4): 1153–1172. 
 Miguel, Edward, and Michael Kremer. 2004. "Worms: Identifying Impacts on Education and Health in the Presence of Treatment Externalities". Econometrica 72 (1): 159–217. 
 Miguel, Edward, Shanker Satyanath, and Ernest Sergenti. 2004. "Economic Shocks and Civil Conflict: An Instrumental Variables Approach". Journal of Political Economy 112 (4): 725–753.

References

External links 
 
 Center for Effective Global Action
 Berkeley Initiative for Transparency in the Social Sciences

1974 births
Environmental economists
Living people
University of California, Berkeley faculty
Harvard University alumni
Massachusetts Institute of Technology alumni
People from Tenafly, New Jersey
Princeton University fellows
Tenafly High School alumni
Economists from New Jersey
21st-century American economists
Fellows of the American Academy of Arts and Sciences